This Old House is an American home improvement media brand with television shows, a magazine, and a website (ThisOldHouse.com). The brand is headquartered in Stamford, Connecticut. The television series airs on the American television network Public Broadcasting Service (PBS) and follows remodeling projects of houses over a series of weekly episodes.

Boston PBS station WGBH-TV originally created the program and produced it from its inception in 1979 until 2001, when Time Inc. acquired the television assets and formed This Old House Ventures. WGBH also distributed episodes to PBS until 2019, when WETA-TV became the distributor starting with the first episode of Season 41. Warner Bros. Domestic Television distributes the series to commercial television stations in broadcast syndication. Time Inc. launched This Old House magazine in 1995, focusing on home how-to, know-how, and inspiration.
 
In 2016, Time Inc. sold This Old House Ventures to executive Eric Thorkilsen and private equity firm TZP Growth Partners (although it will continue to have a special partnership deal with its former parent company). On March 19, 2021, Roku acquired This Old House Ventures.

Overview
This Old House and its sister series Ask This Old House are often broadcast together as The This Old House Hour, which was originally known as The New This Old House Hour. Both shows are owned by This Old House Ventures, Inc. and are underwritten by GMC and The Home Depot.

Two of the original underwriters were Weyerhauser and Owens-Corning. Weyerhauser, a lumber distributor, had donated more than $1,000,000 a year to the show by 1989.  This Old House is also underwritten by State Farm Insurance, HomeServe, and Marvin Windows and Doors. Other underwriters throughout the show's tenure have included Parks Corporation, Glidden, Montgomery Ward, Ace Hardware, Kohler, Schlage, Century 21 Real Estate, Toro, ERA Real Estate, Angie's List, Amica Mutual Insurance, GAF, Mitsubishi Electric, and Lumber Liquidators.

The third series to share the name is Inside This Old House, a retrospective featuring highlights from previous episodes. Old episodes are also shown under the program name This Old House Classics and were formerly shown on The Learning Channel under the name The Renovation Guide. Only the episodes with original host Bob Vila aired under that name. , Classics are also carried on the commercial non-broadcast DIY Network as well as syndicated to local TV stations.

This Old House  was one of the earliest home improvement shows on national television. As such, it was initially controversial among building contractors, and some cast members were afraid that they were giving away secrets of the building trades. As time passed the show grew into a cultural icon, and producer-director Russell Morash became known as the "Father of How-To".

History

Begun in 1979 as a one-time, 13-part series airing on WGBH, This Old House has grown into one of the most popular programs on the network. It has produced spin-offs (notably The New Yankee Workshop hosted by Norm Abram), a magazine, and for-profit web sites. The show has won 17 Emmy Awards and received 82 nominations.

Although WGBH acquired the first two project houses (6 Percival Street in Dorchester and the Bigelow House in Newton) for renovation, the series originally focused on renovating older houses, including those of modest size and value, with the homeowners doing some of the work as a form of sweat equity. The series covering the renovation of the Westwood house (Weatherbee Farm) became something of a cult classic because of an escalating dispute between the hosts, Vila and Abram, and the homeowners over the direction the project was taking. Vila remarked at the end of the Westwood series that the owners could have contributed more "sweat equity". As the show evolved, it began to focus on higher-end, luxury homes with more of the work done by expert contractors and tradespeople.

Vila left This Old House in 1989 following a dispute over his doing commercials, and he created a similar show called Bob Vila's Home Again. According to news reporter Barbara Beck, Vila was fired by WGBH Boston over making TV commercials for Rickel Home Centers, The Home Depot's competitor. Home Depot, the show's underwriter, dropped its local sponsorship for This Old House after Vila made the commercials. Vila was fired in an effort to have Home Depot return as a sponsor to the show. During Vila's tenure, the show drew 11 million viewers and had won five Emmys. Weyerhauser, at this time a supplier for The Home Depot, stopped underwriting the show.

Steve Thomas took over hosting duties after Vila's departure, remaining with the program until 2003. Cast members later complained that Vila took up too much screen time for himself, and noted that the show became more of an ensemble production after he left.

Since 2003, Kevin O'Connor has been the host of This Old House. Before O'Connor joined the cast, he was a homeowner who appeared on Ask This Old House, seeking help with wallpaper removal. While O'Connor has been the host, Abram's role has increased to that of a near co-host. In at least a few season-opening episodes (in Cambridge, Carlisle, and Austin), Abram has appeared alongside O'Connor to introduce the new project. Abram also filled in for O'Connor when his colleague's son was born during the Carlisle project.

Beginning with the 2007–08 season, This Old House and Ask This Old House are presented in a high-definition television format.

To celebrate its 30th anniversary season, This Old House worked with Nuestra Comunidad to renovate a foreclosed home in Boston's Roxbury neighborhood. Nuestra Comunidad is a non-profit development corporation that acquired this 1870s-era Second Empire style home from a bank foreclosure.

In 2016, Time Inc. sold This Old House to a joint venture operating as This Old House Ventures, LLC.

To celebrate the 40th season in 2019, a retrospective and revisit of some of the more-notable projects were incorporated into a handful of episodes, with some of the original homeowners providing tours. The first house highlighted was the original 1979 project house in Dorchester.

On March 19, 2021, TZP Growth Partners completed the sale of This Old House Ventures to Roku. All 1,500 episodes of Ask This Old House and This Old House will be made available to owners of Roku streaming products free with ads, and through their dedicated 24/7 Streaming TV channel. PBS will still have rights to air episodes on their platforms.

Theme music

Ask This Old House

In 2002, Time Inc. created a spinoff of This Old House entitled Ask This Old House. The show was inspired by a similar feature in This Old House Magazine. It takes place in "the loft" of a rural barn somewhere in the Boston area. The regulars on the show have been Kevin O'Connor, Tom Silva, Richard Trethewey, and Roger Cook.  Norm Abram does not appear on Ask This Old House. In later seasons, the spin-off program added landscape expert Jennifer Nawada Evans, eventually replacing Roger Cook, who retired due to unspecified health issues. Other experts making regular appearances include masonry specialist Mark McCullough, paint and finish specialist Mauro Henrique, and electricians Scott Caron and Heath Eastman. Ross Trethewey (son of Richard Trethewey) leads the show's segment called "Future House", covering home automation and related technology.

Magazine readers or show viewers submit home repair or improvement questions to the four regulars, who sometimes also invite guest experts to answer more-specialized questions. Most of the questions are answered in the home-base loft, but one or two homeowners in each episode receive an on-site visit from one of the show's hosts. The visiting host assists in starting or completing the task with the homeowners' hands-on participation. Over the course of several seasons, at least one of the traveling team members has been featured in a segment in each of the 50 US states.

Ask This Old House had a program segment called "What Is It?". In this segment, three of the four regulars would offer lame humorous guesses as to the function of an unusual tool or device, before the fourth regular would reveal its actual use. Beginning with the 2007–08 season, Ask This Old House added a "Useful Tip" segment provided by a viewer of the show; this is a revival of a short-lived feature of This Old House when Bob Vila hosted the show. Another occasional feature is "Home Inspection Nightmares", in which viewer-submitted photographs of badly-made or deteriorated home installations are shown and commented on by the hosts.

The opening sequence of Ask This Old House consisted of a GMC van towing the dark-blue Ask This Old House trailer from around Massachusetts before reaching the barn at the end. The 25-second version of the opening sequence showed Tom Silva, as passenger, picking up four coffees from a drive-through. The original version had Steve Thomas as the driver. The 40-second version of the opening sequence showed Kevin O'Connor as the driver. In both versions, after the van pulls into the barn driveway, the footage cuts to Richard Trethewey handing out the coffees to the other three regulars. The original opening sequence has since been modified, and still shows the travels of the small trailer which has the Ask This Old House logo prominently displayed.

Ask This Old House has been nominated for five Emmy Awards.

This Old House magazine
This Old House magazine was first published in 1995 by Time Inc. Published eight times per year, the magazine has a circulation of over 950,000 and reaches nearly 6 million consumers each month. Nathan Stamos is the publisher. , Susan Wyland, best known for her tenure on Time Inc.'s Real Simple magazine, became the magazine's editor in chief, replacing Scott Omelianuk, who had been editor for 12 years.

ThisOldHouse.com is the brand's website and features how-to projects and inspiration and tips for homeowners. The website also serves as the online destination for the television show and includes bios on the cast, information on all of the home projects, and live webcams of the current house projects.

Inside This Old House

A short-lived spin-off of the This Old House franchise, Inside This Old House was shown primarily on the A&E Network and originally aired from 2003 to 2004. The show was very much like Ask This Old House: it was shot mainly in the "loft", was hosted by O'Connor, and featured the regular experts listed above and also Abram (master carpenter). However, unlike Ask This Old House, usually one or two experts were used throughout the episode and a specific theme was discussed. The theme was usually a particular topic (e.g., landscaping, installing doors, etc.). Along with the in-house expert, and sometimes a guest expert, clips were shown of past episodes of This Old House (mainly the original episodes with Bob Vila) to further illustrate the point as well as revisit past projects undertaken over the previous 25 years to see what the homeowners have done since airing. Each episode ended with a segment called "Inside Out", which featured one of the two guest commentators, Jimmy Dunn and Doreen Vigue, and one of the experts, with a brief and comedic overview of what was discussed on the show.

This Old House: Trade School
In 2017, The CW network began airing a new spin-off, This Old House: Trade School. It is also hosted by Kevin O'Connor and is repurposed to meet E/I regulations for people 13 to 16 years old as part of the One Magnificent Morning program block. Trade School features the stars of This Old House, Norm Abram, Tom Silva, Richard Trethewey, and Roger Cook, showing what it is like to work alongside these seasoned pros.

Episodes

Personnel

Current cast
As of 2022, the cast is as follows:
 Kevin O'Connor (Host)
 Tom Silva (General Contractor)
 Richard Trethewey (Plumbing and Heating Expert)
 Jenn Nawada (Landscape Contractor)
 Mauro Henrique (Painter)
 Mark McCullough (Mason)
 Heath Eastman (Electrician)
 Charlie Silva (Home Builder)

Former cast

 Norm Abram (Master Carpenter, 1979-2022)
 Roger Cook (Landscape Contractor, 1988-2020)
 Steve Thomas (Host, 1989-2003)
 Bob Vila (Host, 1979-1988)

Hosts
The first host of This Old House was designer-builder and remodeling expert Bob Vila. He hosted the program from 1979 to 1989, when he left This Old House to become a spokesman for Sears Roebuck & Company. From 1990 to 2005 he hosted the spinoff program Bob Vila's Home Again, and from 2005 to 2007 he hosted Bob Vila.

For the original program, Vila was followed by Steve Thomas, who hosted from 1989 to 2003. In 2003, Thomas left the show and was replaced by current host Kevin O'Connor.

Television production team
As of 2022, the television production credits are as follows:
 John Tomlin (Senior Producer)
 Sara Ferguson (Coordinating Producer)
 Chris Ermides (Producer/Director)
 Adam Marx (Producer/Director)
 Kathryn Fulton (Associate Producer)
 Stephen D'Onofrio (Director of Photography)
 Edward Obed Martinez (Second Camera)
 Eric Joslin (Drone Operator)
 Makayla Townsend (Production Manager)
 Mike Last (Production Coordinator)
 Harry Nichols (Production Assistant)
 Alaxanra Rainis (Production Intern)
 Eric Joslin (Gaffer)
 Jim Keaney (Audio)
 Adam Bush (Senior Editor)
 Gary Stephenson (Senior Editor)
 Deb Luchini (Editor)
 Brian Patriacca (Editor)
 Michael Svirsky (Visual Effects Artist & Post-Production Supervisor)
 Sara Hoye (Media Coordinator)
 Dani Cook (Station Relations)
 Lauren Douglas (Station Relations)
 Hope Hennessey (Station Relations)
 Kahnh Phan (Station Relations)
 Emily Richburg (Station Relations)
 Jordan Critz (Music)
 Bill Janovitz (Music)
 Handsome Brothers (Music) 
 Pillar 2 Post (Technical Evaluation)
 Fish Eggs (Title Design)
 Daniel Suratt (This Old House Vice-President)
 Michael Burtion (This Old House Productions Director)
 Chris Wolfe (Executive Producer)
 Russell Morash (Creator)
 WETA-TV Washington, DC (Presenter)
 The Home Depot & Duluth Trading Company (Original Production Funding)
 This Old House Productions LLC (Producer)

In popular culture

Like many successful programs, This Old House has found its way into the humorist's eye on occasion. The most famous example is Tool Time, the "show-within-a-show" on the American television situation comedy Home Improvement. Tim Allen played Tim Taylor, a character inspired by Bob Vila, while Richard Karn portrayed Al Borland, a character based on Norm Abram. Bob Vila also guest-starred from time to time as Tim's rival and archenemy. In one episode in 1994, Vila challenges Tim to a hot rod race and Tim tells Vila that he will kick Vila back to "That Old House". When Vila tells Tim that he's no longer on "This Old House" and that he started a new show called "Home Again", Tim says he'll kick Vila "Home Again".

HBO's Hardcore TV parodied This Old House as "This Old Whore House", "This Old House of Style", and "This Old House Party". Bill Nye the Science Guy parodied the show as "This Old Brain", as well as "This Old Climate"; both featured Pat Cashman as Bob Liam. Nick at Nite's On the Television parodied the show as "This Old Backyard".

In 1985, PBS produced its own parody of This Old House titled "This Old Shack", which featured "Bob Villa" and master carpenter "Paul Thumbs" in a three-part rehab in Arlington. In the seventh season of the second series of ZOOM, there was a parody of This Old House retitled as "This Old Place" wherein "Abe Norman" (a parody of Norm Abram), played by Kyle Morrow, would fix something (e.g., a washing machine) that would never function as it should. On one occasion, he put a gown in a washing machine and it came out as the shirt he was wearing currently.

The Disney Channel's The All New Mickey Mouse Club parodied the show as "This Old Home", which featured renovations on the candy house from Hansel and Gretel. Fred Newman portrayed Bob Vilalalala (a parody of Bob Vila). In 1986, Late Night with David Letterman parodied This Old House as "This House Needs Work with David Letterman", wherein Chris Elliott portrayed a head carpenter. In 2000, Blame Society Productions released a parody of This Old House titled "My Old House with Bob Voila". Almost Live! parodied This Old House as "This Here Place", which featured Pat Cashman as "Bob Bobbin".

In 1988, John Larroquette portrayed Bob Vila on the NBC late-night sketch comedy show Saturday Night Live in a parody of This Old House with homeowners Tom (Kevin Nealon) and Peggy McGuinness (Victoria Jackson) in which he rehabilitates an 1865 Victorian farmhouse to have load-bearing walls that sweat blood. Another SNL sketch shows Phil Hartman portraying a robot named XG-7000 who hosts a PBS show called "Robot Repair", where he shows the viewers how to repair a variety of things, like a grandfather clock. The robot objects to the title, saying that it misleadingly implies that robots are in need of repair, rather than doing the repairs, and asks the producer to change it. For the next several weeks, the show's name changes, to equally, if not increasingly, misleading titles, such as "Robot Repair and You", "Explaining Robots", and "Let's Fix, Robots", much to XG-7000's increasing frustration, eventually to the point where he's considering harming the producer, even though his programming prevents him from doing so. Finally, after the title is changed to "This Old Robot", XG-7000 experiences a complete meltdown, and storms off the set to kill the producer. The sketch would end with FOX show called "Fugitive Robots", (parody of America's Most Wanted), where an FBI agent (played by Jon Lovitz) remarked that XG-7000 was now wanted for the brutal murder of said producer, and he identified the show as "Robot Restoration" which was supposedly about how to fix robots. The skit ends with the text reading onscreen: "Fugitive Robots, previously known as Robot Apprehension".

Fox's long-running sketch comedy show Mad TV did a parody called "This Cold House". Fox's In Living Color parodied This Old House as "This Ol' Box". Damon Wayans portrayed a homeless person named Anton Jackson, who talks about renovating a large cardboard box where he lived.

In the mid-1980s, a special on PBS station WTTW-Chicago starring Jim Belushi ostensibly showcasing three pilots for potential new programs featured Belushi as "Bobby Viola," the host of a parody titled "This Old Car."

References

External links
 
 
 

 
1979 American television series debuts
1970s American television series
1980s American television series
1990s American television series
2000s American television series
2010s American television series
2020s American television series
Companies based in Stamford, Connecticut
Construction in the United States
Daytime Emmy Award for Outstanding Talk Show winners
Do it yourself
English-language television shows
Home renovation television series
Magazines established in 1995
PBS original programming
Television series by WGBH
Woodworking mass media
Magazines published in Connecticut
Mass media in Stamford, Connecticut